Lytham St Annes Express is a local weekly newspaper, named after Lytham St Annes largely serving the Fylde Borough. It is published by the Blackpool Gazette and therefore owned by Johnson Press.

References

Newspapers published in Lancashire
Borough of Fylde
Newspapers published by Johnston Press